Stenaster is an extinct genus of brittle stars that lived from the Ordovician to the Silurian.

Sources

 Fossils (Smithsonian Handbooks) by David Ward (Page 187)
(º¿º)

External links
tijera chaaann

Fossils of Norway
Prehistoric Asterozoa genera
Ophiuroidea genera
Ordovician echinoderms
Silurian echinoderms
Ordovician first appearances
Silurian extinctions
Paleozoic echinoderms of Europe